Wigan is a town in Greater Manchester, England.

Wigan may also refer to:

Places
 Metropolitan Borough of Wigan, a metropolitan borough of Greater Manchester, in North West England
 Wigan (UK Parliament constituency), a constituency represented in the House of Commons of the Parliament of the United Kingdom
 Wigan Urban Area, an urbanised area containing Wigan in Greater Manchester and Skelmersdale in West Lancashire
 Wigan Rural District, a rural district in Lancashire, England from 1894 to 1974
 County Borough of Wigan, a local government district from 1889 to 1974 centred on Wigan in the northwest of England

People
 Wigan (surname)
 William Wigan Harvey (1810–1883), English cleric and academic

Sport
 Wigan Warriors (previously known simply as Wigan), a rugby league football club
 Wigan Athletic F.C., an association football club
 Wigan R.U.F.C., a rugby union club
 Wigan St Patricks, an amateur rugby league club often used as a feeder team for the Wigan Warriors
 Wigan St Judes, an amateur rugby league club also used as a feeder team for the Wigan Warriors
 Wigan United A.F.C., a former association football club active in the 1890s
 Wigan County F.C, a former association football club active from 1897 to 1900
 Wigan Town A.F.C., a former association football club active from 1905 to 1908
 Wigan Borough F.C., a former association football club active from 1919 to 1931
 Wigan Robin Park F.C., a former association football club active from 2005 to 2015

Other uses
 A fabric called  wigan (fabric) made by coating cotton cloth with latex rubber to make it waterproof
 According to Ifugao mythology, Wigan is the god of good harvest